Justice Gordon may refer to:

Frank Gordon Jr. (1929–2020), associate justice of the Arizona Supreme Court
Isaac G. Gordon (1819–1893), associate justice and chief justice of the Supreme Court of Pennsylvania
Sir John Hannah Gordon (1850–1923), judge of the Supreme Court of South Australia
Merritt J. Gordon (1857–1925), associate justice of the Washington Supreme Court
Michelle Gordon (born 1964), justice of the High Court of Australia
Myron L. Gordon (1918–2009), associate justice of the Wisconsin Supreme Court
Peyton Gordon (1870–1946), associate justice of the District Court of the United States for the District of Columbia
Thomas C. Gordon (1915–2003), associate justice of the Supreme Court of Appeals of Virginia
Thomas Gordon (lawyer) (1652–1722), chief justice of the New Jersey Supreme Court